Henry F. West (14 March 1796 – October 1856, in Indianapolis) was the fifth mayor of the city of Indianapolis, Indiana. West, a Democrat, took office in 1856 but died within the first month of his term.

References

Mayors of Indianapolis
Indiana Democrats
1796 births
1856 deaths
19th-century American politicians